Pedro de Morais Neto is an Angolan diplomat and military figure. From 1994 to 2008, he served as the chief of the Angola National Airforce. On 16 January 2008, Neto became Ambassador to Zambia, presenting his credentials to Zambian President Levy Mwanawasa.

References 

Year of birth missing (living people)
Living people
Angolan military personnel
Angolan diplomats
Ambassadors of Angola to Zambia